Ronald A. Wait (born April 15, 1944) is a former Republican member of the Illinois House of Representatives, representing the 69th district from 1995 to 2011. He previously served as a member in the Illinois House of Representatives from 1983 to 1993.

Legislative career
He was first elected in 1982 defeating Democratic candidate Judith A. Weiher. The 64th district included all of Boone County, eastern Winnebago County, and the northern half of McHenry County.

In the 1991 decennial redistricting process, Wait was redistricted into the 68th House District. The 68th included all of Boone County, eastern Winnebago County outside of Rockford, and a small portion of northern DeKalb County. In the 1992 general election, Wait was defeated by Democratic candidate Barbara Giolitto. In a 1994 rematch, the staunchly Republican district reverted to form and Wait was returned to the Illinois House of Representatives.

During the 2001 decennial redistricting process, Wait's retained much of his previous district, but the district was renumbered from the 68th district to the 69th district. Wait opted to retire from the Illinois House of Representatives and run for a judgeship in the 17th Circuit Court of Illinois. In a three-way Republican primary, Wait lost to former Boone County State's Attorney Jim Hursh. Husch would go on to lose to independent candidate Rob Tobin. Rockford City Councilman and fellow Republican Joe Sosnowski defeated Belvidere City Councilman and Democratic candidate Ray Pendzinski.

References

External links
Illinois General Assembly – Representative Ronald A. Wait (R) 69th District official IL House website
Bills Committees
Project Vote Smart – Representative Ronald A. Wait (IL) profile
Illinois House Republican Caucus – Ron Wait profile

1944 births
20th-century American politicians
21st-century American politicians
Farmers from Illinois
Illinois lawyers
Living people
Republican Party members of the Illinois House of Representatives
People from Belvidere, Illinois
Drake University alumni
Northern Illinois University alumni
Drake University Law School alumni